Breathe was a rock band from Wellington, New Zealand, consisting of Andrew Tilby (vocals, guitar), Richard Small (guitar, vocals), Pet Johnson (bass guitar), Steve Gallagher (keyboards) and Guy Fisher (drums). The band was formed in the mid-1990s by Hutt Valley school friends Small, Tilby, Fisher and Gallagher, with the addition of Johnson.

Breathe independently released a 7" single and a CD EP, Things Like These, before signing to the independent Auckland record label, Felix. In 1996, they released the Smiley Hands CD EP before taking a break to record their first album Pop Life, which was again released on the Felix label, with distribution through BMG. The band toured throughout New Zealand for seven months in 1998, eventually appearing as support on the Exponents Summer Tour, where their live show captured the attention of Sony Music NZ who signed the band a few weeks after its end.

Andrew Tilby won the "Tui" as Most Promising Male Vocalist at the 1999 New Zealand Music Awards.

While Breathe were signed to Sony they released their second album, Don't Stop The Revolution, in 2000. The title track, "Don't Stop The Revolution", reached number 6 in New Zealand charts while "Landslide" reached 28.

Breathe disbanded in 2001 when drummer Guy Fisher decided to leave the band. The remaining members formed Dead End Beat, who released a self-titled album in 2004.

Discography

Albums

Singles

References 

New Zealand rock music groups
Musical groups established in 1995
Musical groups disestablished in 2001
Sony Music New Zealand artists